Aaron Geddes Graham (born May 22, 1973) is a former professional American football center who played six seasons in the National Football League (NFL) for the Arizona Cardinals (1996–1999), the Oakland Raiders (2001), and the Tennessee Titans (2002). Graham also played college football for the University of Nebraska–Lincoln from 1991 to 1995, where he played in three national championship games, winning two in 1994 and 1995.

High school career 
Graham attended Denton High School in Denton, Texas, where he played for the Denton Broncos high school football team.

College career 
Graham attended the University of Nebraska-Lincoln, where he played college football for the Nebraska Cornhuskers from 1991 to 1995 under head coach Tom Osborne. Graham played as the starting center for most of the 1993 through 1995 seasons, and played in three national championship games, winning two back-to-back in 1994 and 1995. During his 1993 season, Graham and the Cornhuskers entered the 1993 Orange Bowl ranked number 11 at 9-2 but lost to Florida State University. In 1994, Graham and the Cornhuskers finished the season with an 13–0 record, beating Miami for the national title in the 1994 Orange Bowl. In his senior season, Graham and the Cornhuskers won the rest of their regular season games, finishing 12-0. Nebraska won the championship game against Florida in the Fiesta Bowl, 62-24.

As a senior, Graham was named the 1995 AP All-American Football Player. He won multiple awards during his college career such as Academic All-American from 1994 to 1995 and the 1996 Top Eight Award that is given to the nation's elite scholar athletes.  While playing college ball for Nebraska he was also recognized by the NCAA for "athletic accomplishments, academic achievements, character, leadership and other activities".

Professional career 
Graham played six seasons as center in the NFL with the Arizona Cardinals (1996–1999), the Oakland Raiders (2001), and the Tennessee Titans (2002). Graham was planning on going back for his 7th season with the Tennessee Titans, but instead retired after six seasons with the NFL.

References

External links
Just Sports Stats

1973 births
Living people
People from Las Vegas, New Mexico
Sportspeople from Denton, Texas
Players of American football from Texas
American football centers
Nebraska Cornhuskers football players
Arizona Cardinals players
Oakland Raiders players
Tennessee Titans players
Players of American football from New Mexico
Sportspeople from the Dallas–Fort Worth metroplex
Las Vegas Outlaws (XFL) players